Zero: The Biography of a Dangerous Idea is a non-fiction book by American author and journalist Charles Seife. The book was initially released on February 7, 2000, by Viking.

Background
The book offers a comprehensive look at number 0 and its controverting role as one of the great paradoxes of human thought and history since its invention by the ancient Babylonians or the Indian people. Even though zero is a fundamental idea for the modern science, initially the notion of a complete absence got a largely negative, sometimes hostile, treatment by the Western world and Greco-Roman philosophy. Zero won the 2001 PEN/Martha Albrand Award for First Nonfiction Book.

Review

See also

References

External links
Profile on goodreads.com

Popular mathematics books
2000 non-fiction books
Biographies (books)
Philosophical mass media